zZakaria Atteri (born 11 February 2002) is a Belgian professional footballer who plays as a forward for Belgian First Division B club Dender.

Personal life
Born in Belgium, Atteri is of Moroccan descent.

References

Living people
2002 births
Association football midfielders
Belgian footballers
Belgian sportspeople of Moroccan descent
Royal Excel Mouscron players
Royal Knokke F.C. players
F.C.V. Dender E.H. players
Belgian Pro League players
Belgian National Division 1 players